Municipal election for Kathmandu took place on 13 May 2022, with all 162 positions up for election across 32 wards. The electorate elected a mayor, a deputy mayor, 32 ward chairs and 128 ward members. An indirect election will also be held to elect five female members and an additional three female members from the Dalit and minority community to the municipal executive.

Background 

Kathmandu was established as a municipality in 1919. After the formulation of the 1951 Municipality Act, the first municipal elections were held in Nepal and Janakman Shrestha became the first elected mayor of Kathmandu. The municipality was declared as a metropolitan city in 1995 by then mayor Prem Lal Singh. Keshav Sthapit was the first elected mayor of Kathmandu after it had been declared as a metropolitan city. Electors in each ward elect a ward chair and four ward members, out of which two must be female and one of the two must belong to the Dalit community.

In the previous election, Bidhya Sundar Shakya from CPN (Unified Marxist–Leninist) was elected mayor.

Candidates

CPN (Unified Marxist–Leninist) 
The incumbent mayor Bidhya Sundar Shakya, announced in February 2022 that he would want to run for re-election if the party wanted him to. But on April 24 the party announced that it would field former mayor Keshav Sthapit as its candidate. Sthapit was first elected mayor in 1997 and was appointed mayor again in 2005 by then King Gyanendra. He was later also appointed as  the commissioner of Kathmandu Valley Development Authority by Prime Minister Baburam Bhattarai, but was removed after only nine months. Sthapit was a member of the provincial assembly of Bagmati Province and previously served in the cabinet of Chief Minister Dormani Paudel but resigned to file his candidacy.

Sunita Dangol, a Newa heritage activist and former Miss Newa who had previously announced her intention to run as mayor as an independent was announced as the deputy mayor candidate from the party.

Nepali Congress 
The Nepali Congress, CPN (Maoist Centre), CPN (Unified Socialist), People's Socialist Party, Nepal and Rastriya Janamorcha announced that they would jointly contest the local elections in some local units in the country.

Sirjana Singh of Nepali Congress was announced as the candidate of the alliance on April 25. She is the wife of former deputy Prime Minister and MP Prakash Man Singh. She is also a former chairperson of Nepal Woman Association.

Rameshwar Shrestha from the CPN (Unified Socialist) was announced as the candidate of deputy mayor from the alliance.

Balendra Shah 
Rapper and structural engineer Balendra Shah announced his candidacy as an independent on 17 December 2021.

Other parties and candidates

Opinion polls

Exit polls

Results

Mayoral election

Ward results 

|-
! colspan="2" style="text-align:centre;" | Party
! Chairperson
! Members
|-
| bgcolor="" |
| style="text-align:left;" |Nepali Congress
| style="text-align:center;" |19
| style="text-align:center;" |74
|-
| bgcolor="" |
| style="text-align:left;" |CPN (Unified Marxist-Leninist)
| style="text-align:center;" |12
| style="text-align:center;" |48
|-
| bgcolor="" |
| style="text-align:left;" |CPN (Unified Socialist)
| style="text-align:center;" | 1
| style="text-align:center;" | 4
|-
! colspan="2" style="text-align:right;" | Total
! 32
! 126
|}

Summary of results by ward 

Note: 4 candidates (1 from Nepali Congress and 3 from CPN-UML) for Ward Members were elected unopposed under Dalit woman reserved seats. 2 Ward Member seats reserved for Dalit women were left unfilled due to lack of candidates

Results for municipal executive election 
The municipal executive consists of the mayor, who is also the chair of the municipal executive, the deputy mayor and ward chairs from each ward. The members of the municipal assembly elected five female members and three members from the Dalit or minority community to the municipal executive using single non-transferable vote.

Municipal Assembly composition

Results

Municipal Executive composition

See also 
 Elections in Nepal
 2022 Nepalese local elections
 2022 Lalitpur municipal election
 2017 Kathmandu municipal election
 2022 Janakpur municipal election
 2022 Bharatpur municipal election

References

History of Kathmandu
Kathmandu